The family Cochlonemataceae is a fungus classified in the order Zoopagales. Fungi found in this family are predominantly parasitic and can be found in any substrate that contains an ample amount of host or prey organisms.

The family contains six genera.

References

External links
 Zoopagales at Zygomycetes.org

Zygomycota